Chuggington is an animated television series for children.
The following tables list the episodes for the series, which were first broadcast in the UK on BBC Two or CBeebies, starting in 2009. The Main Episodes are each about 10 minutes long, the Badge Quest Episodes are each about 4 minutes long, and Special Episode 1 is just over 23 minutes long.

Series overview

Episodes

Series 1 (2008–2009)

Series 2 (2010)

Series 3 (2011)

Series 4 (2013–2014)

Series 5 (2015)

Series 6: Tales from the Rails (2021)
A new series of episodes was released on June 29, 2020 in the USA, and in the UK on January 2, 2021. The season consists of 46 regular 10-minute episodes and two 24-minute specials: Chugging Home for the Holidays and Celebrate Chuggington.

Specials

Badge Quest (2010–2012)

In each episode, one or more of the trainees try to earn a particular badge by completing a specific task or accomplishing a certain goal.

References

Lists of British children's television series episodes
Lists of British animated television series episodes